Jean Mervyn Jocelyn (born 21 August 1991) is a Mauritian international footballer who plays for Pamplemousses as a central defender.

Career
Born in Beau Bassin-Rose Hill, Jocelyn has played club football for Chebel Citizens, Rivière du Rempart, La Cure Sylvester and Pamplemousses.

He made his international debut for Mauritius in 2017. on 19 August 2017, he scored his first and only goal against India in their 1–2 defeat.

International goals
''Scores and results are list Mauritius's goal tally first.

References

1991 births
Living people
Mauritian footballers
Mauritius international footballers
AS Rivière du Rempart players
Pamplemousses SC players
Association football defenders